The Flat Rock Archives is an African American historical museum located in the city of Stonecrest, Georgia. The mission of the archive is to preserve rural African American history in Georgia. The archive is located in a historic home built by T.A. Bryant, Sr., and was donated in 2005, by Rev. T.A. Bryant, Jr. and his sister, Zudia Guthrie, to preserve and store all the Flat Rock records and documents. It was established as a museum and resource to genealogical and historic research, as well as a heritage tourism site. The Flat Rock Archives consists of a variety of historic sites including the Flat Rock African American Historic Cemetery. All of these sites are located within the Arabia Mountain National Heritage Area. See Flat Rock, Georgia to learn more about the history of this area.

History 
Since 1981, after a childhood of listening to the stories of his elders, Flat Rock native, Johnny Waits developed a vision to preserve the African-American history of the Flat Rock community. In December 2006, the Flat Rock Archives opened to the public. The co-founders of the archive is T.A. Bryant, Jr., Vera Whitaker, and Johnny Waits. Johnny Waits is the current President of the archive.

In 2006, the Flat Rock Archives was part of a segment on African American Lives, episode "Listening to our Past" featuring Chris Tucker.

The Flat Rock Archives Goal of Preserving Memories 
One goal of the Flat Rock Archives is to preserve the memories of the Flat Rock community. President of the archive, Johnny Waits wants the sounds, memories, and stories to be preserved and heard for generations to come. 

In an Atlanta Journal Constitution article from 2005, Cleveland McMullen (aged 83 at the time) shared that he grew up in Flat Rock and joined the exodus of thousands of Southern blacks who fled to the North during the Great Depression to find jobs in factories and escape enforced segregation. He recalled that Flat Rock had its own "scout" team (baseball), which played rivals from nearby communities, such as Lithonia, and, toward Atlanta, Edgewood. But McMullen can't recall the team name of the home nine, just that "it was a big deal, people came from all over. They'd have a barbecue, make a whole day of it."

The Flat Rock Historical Landscape 
The Archives sit within a historical landscape and currently maintain the 20th century Georgian Cottage known as the T.A. Bryant, Sr. House built in 1917. The T.A. Bryant, Sr. house was donated to the Archives by T.A. Bryant, Sr.'s son and Co-Founder T.A. Bryant, Jr. The site also includes a barn, smokehouse, and outhouse constructed throughout the 20th century.

The historical landscape also includes the Historical African American Flat Rock Cemetery. According to Dr. Jeffrey Glover of Georgia State University's 2008 cemetery mapping project there are approximately 202 graves with 107 being unidentified fieldstones.

Community outreach 
The Flat Rock Archives is currently collecting and preserving a wide range of archival material, including genealogical records, newspaper articles, photographs, maps, church records, school records, rare books, and tangible artifacts that relate to African-American history in the rural South.

In 2010, the Flat Rock Archives worked with Arabia Mountain High School to perform an honorary school graduation ceremony for eight African American elders of the Flat Rock community who were in their 70s, 80s and 90s.   The students all attended Flat Rock School in the 1930s and 1940s, a time when there was such hostility to educating blacks. The students were given honorary high school diplomas from the DeKalb County school system because during the time they were in school the county did not give high school diplomas to blacks.

The DeKalb History Center is currently housing the Flat Rock Archives exhibit "Deep Roots in DeKalb: The Flat Rock Story of Resilience". It includes objects collected from community residents that showcase more than 150 years of history. Deep Roots in DeKalb: The Flat Rock Story of Resilience is Open at the DeKalb History Center in Decatur, Georgia through 2021. An opening reception was held on the evening of Thursday, February 28th, 2019, at the DeKalb History Center. Staff of the DeKalb History Center, Flat Rock Archives, National Park Service and the Arabia Mountain Heritage Area Alliance were present, as well as members of the public and officials from DeKalb County and the cities of Decatur, Lithonia, and Stonecrest.

The Archives also maintains the Historic African American Flat Rock Cemetery.

References

External links 
 

2006 establishments in Georgia (U.S. state)
African-American museums in Georgia (U.S. state)
Museums established in 2006
Museums in DeKalb County, Georgia
Stonecrest, Georgia